The canton of Henrichemont was a canton situated in the Cher département and in the Centre region of France. It was disbanded following the French canton reorganisation which came into effect in March 2015. In 2012, it had 3,465 inhabitants.

Geography
The canton encompassed a farming and forestry area in the arrondissement of Bourges, centered around the town of Henrichemont. The altitude varies from 191m in Montigny to 428m in Humbligny, with a mean altitude of 290m.

The canton comprised 7 communes:
Achères
La Chapelotte
Henrichemont
Humbligny
Montigny
Neuilly-en-Sancerre
Neuvy-Deux-Clochers

Population

See also
 Arrondissements of the Cher department
 Cantons of the Cher department
 Communes of the Cher department

References

Henrichemont
2015 disestablishments in France
States and territories disestablished in 2015